Cynar was an Italian professional cycling team that existed from 1963 to 1965. Its main sponsor was Italian liqueur Cynar.

References

External links

Cycling teams based in Italy
Defunct cycling teams based in Italy
1963 establishments in Italy
1965 disestablishments in Italy
Cycling teams established in 1963
Cycling teams disestablished in 1965